Hakea asperma, commonly known as the Native Dog hakea, is an endangered shrub of the Proteaceae endemic to a small area in northeastern Victoria. An unusual species that has no fruit and only reproduces by suckering.

Description
It has erect stems and smooth, smaller branches. New leaves have white silky hairs becoming rusty coloured toward the apex. It flowers in late spring to early summer around November and produces an inflorescence containing 6 to 10 white flowers. This species does not produce fruit and only reproduces asexually by root suckering.

Taxonomy
Hakea asperma species was first formally described by botanists William Molyneux and Susan G. Forrester in 2009 in the journal Muelleria.

Distribution and habitat
Hakea asperma grows in mallee communities on the lower slopes of small steep hills in shallow rocky soils in between rocks to support its roots.

Conservation status
Hakea asperma is classified as "critically endangered" by the Government of Victoria Environment Protection Amendment Act 2018  due to its exceedingly small population size of only a few plants which makes the species highly susceptible to extinction by fire or other unknown occurrences.

References

asperma
Flora of Victoria (Australia)
Plants described in 2009